The Giau Pass (Ladin: Jof de Giau) (el. 2236 m.) is a high mountain pass in the Dolomites in the province of Belluno in Italy. It connects Cortina d'Ampezzo with Colle Santa Lucia and Selva di Cadore.

It is located at the center of a vast mountain pasture at the foot of Nuvolau (2,574 m) and dell'Averau (2,647 m) from which you can easily reach the Monte Pore (2,405 m). Impressive is the view west towards Colle Santa Lucia with the Pale di San Martino, Cime D'Auta, Marmolada, Piz Boe and Setsass, just to the east towards the valley of Cortina d'Ampezzo, with Tofane, Croda Rossa, Pomagagnon, Cristallo, Croda da Lago, etc.

Accessibility and Territory 
Passo Giau is comprised in the territories of Colle Santa Lucia, San Vito di Cadore, Cortina d'Ampezzo, and Selva di Cadore. The road that goes up from Selva di Cadore has 29 tornanti and 3 tunnels for protection against avalanches, while the side towards Cortina is more easily passable. It is an interesting alternative to get to Cortina from Agordino area also because the road of Passo Giau, unlike the Passo Falzarego road is passable by trucks and coaches. However, despite the efforts made over the years, the winter season is often compromised by the avalanches that come down to block the uncovered parts of the road.

Mountain Huts 
Rifugio Passo Giau (2236 m) - Colle Santa Lucia

Rirugio Da Aurelio (2175 m) - Colle Santa Lucia

Rifugio Fedare (2000 m) - Colle Santa Lucia

Malga Giau (1900 m) - San Vito di Cadore

Maratona dles Dolomites bicycle race 
Since 1988 the Giau Pass is the sixth and steepest of seven Dolomites mountain passes riders cross in the annual Maratona dles Dolomites single-day bicycle race.

See also
 List of highest paved roads in Europe
 List of mountain passes

Mountain passes of the Dolomites